Jacqueline Saburido (20 December 1978 – 20 April 2019) was a Venezuelan activist and burn survivor who campaigned against drunk driving. After a car crash in 1999, Saburido received burns on 60% of her body; she went on to appear in drunk-driving ads and was twice a guest on The Oprah Winfrey Show. She also unsuccessfully tried to become Britain's first face transplant patient.

Early life and accident
The only child of Rosalia and Amadeo Saburido, she lived in Caracas, Venezuela, for all of her childhood. Living with her father after her parents divorced, she studied engineering in the hope of taking over the family air conditioning business. 

On 19 September 1999, Saburido attended a birthday party near Austin, Texas. She and her friends left after a few hours, and accepted a ride home from a classmate. A short while into the drive, their 1990 Oldsmobile Ninety-Eight Regency was hit by a 1996 GMC Yukon driven by Reginald Stephey, who had been drinking beforehand. The driver and one passenger of the vehicle she was in were killed, with the other passengers injured; of the three survivors, Saburido was the only one trapped in the car when it caught fire, and was unable to escape the flames. Passing paramedics extinguished the fire and tried to remove people from the car, but the fire reignited before they could rescue Saburido; they also lacked suitable equipment to cut her out. Forty-five seconds later, a fire truck arrived and fully extinguished the fire, after which Saburido was airlifted to the burn unit in Galveston.

Saburido suffered second and third degree burns to more than 60% of her body, but survived despite her doctor's expectations. Her fingers had to be amputated, but there was enough bone left on her thumb to construct an opposable thumb. She lost her hair, ears, nose, lips, left eyelid, and much of her vision. Saburido subsequently underwent more than 120 reconstructive operations, including cornea transplants to restore her left eye.

In June 2001, Stephey was convicted on two counts of intoxicated manslaughter. Saburido and Stephey met for the first time after his trial and conviction in 2001. Saburido has stated that Stephey "destroyed my life completely", but forgave him. Regarding the meeting, Stephey later stated that "What sticks out in my mind is, 'Reggie, I don't hate you.' It's really touching someone can look you in the eyes and have that much compassion after all that I have caused".

Saburido was among 21 disfigured people who had approached surgeons at a London hospital to carry out Britain's first face transplant operation; she was not selected. She continued looking into other possibilities for a face transplant in other nations and hospitals.

Advocacy and media appearances
Saburido allowed graphic post-accident photographs of herself to be used in the media (posters, television commercials, and internet chain mail) to illustrate a possible outcome of drunk driving. She is best known for a commercial in which she holds a pre-accident photo of herself in front of the camera, which she lowers to reveal her disfigured face and says, "This is me, after being hit by a drunk driver." When asked why she appeared in the campaign, Saburido stated "I feel very good to do it because I know people can understand a little more what happened to me – why my life changed completely. So I think for me, for everybody, it's a good opportunity." To ensure the material involving Saburido that was used in an ad campaign by the Texas Department of Transportation could also be used in schools, the videos and photos taken of her involved the use of soft lighting to improve her appearance and consultation with child psychologists to ensure the material, although graphic, would not frighten children.

Regarding her life after the accident, Saburido said that she never gave up: "If a person stumbles, he must pick himself up and keep going. I believe this is very important; if not, life would not have much sense." She appeared on The Oprah Winfrey Show on 17 November 2003. She was also interviewed on the Australian 60 Minutes on 14 March 2004, and was featured in a Discovery Health documentary on face transplants. Oprah Winfrey called Saburido the one person she had met who defined "inner beauty" and that she is "a woman who defines survival."

When Stephey was released from the Huntsville Unit in Texas on 24 June 2008, Saburido stated: "I don't hate him, I don't feel bad because he's out, he can reconstruct his life again." On 20 May 2011, Saburido appeared in one of the last episodes of The Oprah Winfrey Show, which was dedicated to Winfrey's favorite guests. Saburido revealed that she had undergone over 120 surgeries by that date.

Death
On 20 April 2019, Saburido died of cancer in Guatemala City. Her family stated that she had moved to Guatemala a few years previously seeking better treatment for her illness. Saburido was buried in Caracas.

According to TxDOT's Faces of Drunk Driving Campaign, Saburido’s story had been told to at least one billion people worldwide by the time of her death.

References

External links
Facesofdrunkdriving.com

1978 births
2019 deaths
Burn survivors
Venezuelan amputees
Deaths from cancer in Guatemala
Driving under the influence
People from Austin, Texas
People from Caracas
Venezuelan emigrants to the United States
Venezuelan women activists